Konidela is a Telugu surname. Notable people with the surname include:
 
 Konidela Siva Sankara Vara Prasad (popularly known with his screen name Chiranjeevi), a film actor and Producer.
 Pawan Kalyan Konidela, an Indian actor, writer, composer, producer and politician.
 Ram Charan Konidela, an Indian actor, producer and entrepreneur.
 Varun Tej Konidela, an Indian actor.
 Niharika Konidela, a Telugu actress
 Konidela Nagendra Babu, an Indian actor, producer and politician.

Telugu-language surnames
Indian surnames
Surnames of Indian origin